The Supercopa do Brasil Sub-20, is an official Brazilian national football super cup tournament for U-20 teams, reuniting the champions of Campeonato Brasileiro Sub-20 and Copa do Brasil Sub-20 of the season.

List of champions

Following there are all the Supercup U-20 editions:

Titles by club

See also
 Supercopa do Brasil Sub-17

References

Youth football competitions in Brazil
5
Under-20 association football
Sports leagues established in 2017